The Ostrobothnian Museum is a provincial museum of cultural history, which also serves as provincial art museum and  a museum of natural science.

A medical doctor from Vaasa,  (1864-1931) was active in creation of the museum. The building was constructed in 1930, and the Hedmans had their own home and collection on one floor. They had no children, and left their collection to fund, which later donated it to the city.

References 

History museums in Finland